Yamangalea is a genus of South Pacific jumping spiders that was first described by Wayne Paul Maddison in 2009.  it contains two species, found in Australia and Papua New Guinea: Y. frewana and Y. lubinae.

References

External links
 Yamangalea frewana

Salticidae genera
Salticidae
Spiders of Australia
Spiders of Oceania